Barnen från Frostmofjället is a 1945 Swedish film, directed by Rolf Husberg. It is based on the novel with the same name by Laura Fitinghoff. The story concerns seven orphans and a goat named Gullspira travelling in northern Sweden during the 1860s. The name of the goat, Gullspira, is now used for the award for the best children's film maker.

Cast
 Hans Lindgren as Ante
 Siv Hansson as Maglena
 Anders Nyström as Månke
 Ann-Sophie Honeth as Anna-Lisa (credited as Fiffi Hornett)
 Ulf Berggren as Per-Erik
 Paula Jagæus as Brita-Kajsa (credited as Paula Jageus)
 Christina Jagæus as Märta-Greta (credited as Kristina Jageus)
 John Ericsson as Sko-Pelle
 Dora Söderberg as Britta
 Ragnar Falck as Artur Grape
 Britta Brunius as Mrs. Grape
 Birger Åsander as Stor-Anders
 Karin Högel as Dordi
 Ingrid Luterkort as Brita
 Helge Hagerman as Oskar Niva
 Solveig Hedengran as Mrs. Niva
 Gunnar Sjöberg as Vicar
 Axel Högel as Peasant
 Carl Deurell as Stor-Jon, a peasant (credited as Karl Deurell)
 Carl Ericson as a peasant (credited as Karl Eriksson)

References

External links
 
 

Films directed by Rolf Husberg
Swedish drama films
1945 drama films
1945 films
Swedish black-and-white films
1940s Swedish films
1940s Swedish-language films